Three Hours to Kill is a 1954 American Western film directed by Alfred L. Werker and starring Dana Andrews, Donna Reed and Dianne Foster.

It inspired the 1956 Roger Corman film Gunslinger.

Plot
Jim Guthrie (Dana Andrews) returns to town three years after being falsely accused of murdering Carter Mastin (Richard Webb). Jim finds that his old friend Ben East (Stephen Elliott) is now the sheriff. In a flashback, Jim recounts his near-lynching by a mob convinced he had shot Carter in the back. Laurie (Donna Reed), Carter's sister, who was planning on marrying Jim, disrupts the lynching, and Jim narrowly escapes. He still bears a neck scar from his ordeal. Ben gives Jim three hours to find the true killer. Through confrontations with several of the men who had been eager to hang him, Jim is led to the guilty man.

Cast
 Dana Andrews as Jim Guthrie
 Donna Reed as Laurie Mastin
 Dianne Foster as Chris Palmer
 Stephen Elliott as Sheriff Ben East
 Richard Coogan as Niles Hendricks
 Laurence Hugo as Marty Lasswell
 James Westerfield as Sam Minor
 Richard Webb as Carter Mastin
 Carolyn Jones as Polly
 Charlotte Fletcher as Betty
 Whit Bissell as Deke
 Francis McDonald as Deputy Vince

References

External links
 
 
 
 

1954 films
American Western (genre) films
1954 Western (genre) films
Columbia Pictures films
Films directed by Alfred L. Werker
Films scored by Paul Sawtell
1950s English-language films
1950s American films